Hassan Mtenga (from Mtwara Region) is a Tanzanian politician currently serves as a Chama Cha Mapinduzi's Member of Parliament for Mtwara Urban constituency since November 2020.

See also
 Adolf Mkenda

References

External links
 Hassan Mtenga Instagram

Chama Cha Mapinduzi politicians
Chama Cha Mapinduzi MPs
Tanzanian MPs 2020–2025
Living people
Year of birth missing (living people)
People from Kilimanjaro Region